Go God Go is the third studio album of Fred. The singles "Skyscrapers" and "Running" were played across Irish radio, and "Good One" was performed on Tubridy Tonight on 21 March 2009. "Skyscrapers" was named iTunes Canada's "Single of the Week" in October 2008.

Track listing

Release history

References 

2008 albums
Fred (band) albums